Salles is the name of several communes in France:

 Salles, Gironde, in the Gironde department
 Salles, Lot-et-Garonne, in the Lot-et-Garonne department
 Salles, Hautes-Pyrénées, in the Hautes-Pyrénées department
 Salles, Deux-Sèvres, in the Deux-Sèvres department
 Salles, Tarn, in the Tarn department